Colonel Mahmoud Chérif (1912–1987) was an Algerian military leader and politician. He was born in Chéria in the Tébessa governorship (wilaya) in 1912. After school, he joined the French army and graduated from training courses with the rank of lieutenant. He participated as a French-Algerian soldier on the side of the Allies in the Second World War. After the war, he joined Ferhat Abbas's UDMA movement, which worked peacefully—but unsuccessfully—for Algerian rights. Soon after the outbreak of the Algerian War of Independence in 1954, he joined the Front de libération nationale (FLN) resistance movement, where his military command experience guaranteed him an important role. He headed the rebellion in FLN's Wilaya I -- an area which included the Tébessa region—and was later promoted colonel in the Armée de libération nationale (ALN), FLN's armed wing. When the FLN created its government-in-exile (GPRA) in 1958, Chérif was made minister of armament and materiel under Abbas's presidency, until a 1960 reshuffle.

Sources 

 1 Novémbre Website 
 Liste des membres du 1er GPRA 1958/1960 

1912 births
1987 deaths
Algerian military personnel